Grupo Intermedia, S.A de C.V. is a Mexican television company, located in Ciudad Juárez, Chihuahua, Mexico.

Intermedia was founded in 1980 by Arnoldo Cabada de la O, XHIJ-TV's founder and company owner.

Owned assets 
Grupo Intermedia owns various assets, including two television stations, a restaurant, a spa, a U.S. immigration visas center, two subnetworks, and a foundation.

Television stations

Digital television subnetworks

Ciudad Juárez 
These networks broadcast in XHIJ-TV's subchannels 44.2 and 44.3.

 44 Alternativo
 Televisión Universitaria (Operated by Universidad Autónoma de Ciudad Juárez)

Mexicali 
These networks broadcast in XHILA-TV's subchannels 66.2, 66.3 and 66.4.

 Cadenatres XHTRES-TV
 Canal 66 (Delayed)
 Milenio Television

Physical assets 
 Café 44 (restaurant)
 Visas 44 (U.S immigration visas center)
 Santé Med-Spa (spa)

Foundation 
 Fundación Arnoldo Cabada de la O

References

External links 
 Canal 44
 44 Alternativo
 Canal 66
 Fundación Arnoldo Cabada de la O

Companies established in 1980
Companies based in Ciudad Juárez
Television broadcasting companies of Mexico
Mass media in Ciudad Juárez
1980 establishments in Mexico